Peristernia clathrata is a species of sea snail, a marine gastropod mollusk in the family Fasciolariidae, the spindle snails, the tulip snails and their allies.

Description
The length of the shel lattains 26.8 mm.

Distribution

References

External links
 Kiener L.C. 1840-1841. Spécies général et iconographie des coquilles vivantes. Vol. 6. Famille des Canalifères. Deuxième partie. Genres Pyrule (Pyrula), Lamarck, pp. 1-34, pl. 1-15 

Fasciolariidae
Gastropods described in 1840